Egypt–Germany relations are the foreign relations between Egypt and Germany. The diplomatic relations between Egypt and Germany began in December 1957.

History

Egypt severed diplomatic relations with Nazi Germany on 4 September 1939, one day after the British declaration of war on Germany. German nationals in Egypt were interned and their property and businesses put in the care of a "Public Custodian for Enemy Assets". In April 1941, King Farouk sent a secret note to the German leader, Adolf Hitler, "looking forward to seeing German troops victorious in Egypt as soon as possible and as liberators from the intolerably brutal English yoke". In his reply, Hitler expressed a desire for the "independence of Egypt". On 26 February 1945, towards the end of World War II, Egypt formally declared war on Germany.

In December, 1953, the diplomatic relations between Egypt and Germany started the first technical cooperation projects including the projects of professional habilitation, laying studies of the crude iron and other metallic prospections.

Diplomatic missions
Egypt has an embassy in Berlin, as well as consulates in Frankfurt and Hamburg. Germany has an embassy in Cairo and a consulate in Alexandria.

Economic relations
Egypt ranked third among the Arab countries trading with Germany. The German exports to Egypt totalled 2.1 billion euro in 2007. Whilst exports to Germany totalled 804 million euro.
The German investments in Egypt are concentrated in the fields of small and medium-scale industries, information technology, car assembling, energy and land reclamation. In July 2005, Egypt and Germany signed an agreement on encouraging and protecting investments.

Tourism
Egypt is one of the most important destinations for German tourists. In 2007, German visitors to Egypt numbered over one million (1,086,000), making Germans the second-largest group of tourists after the Russians.  The Egyptian Government reports continuing growth of German tourists and estimates the possibility of reaching high levels of German tourists' inflow to hit 1.2 million.

German airline Lufthansa is one of the oldest foreign airlines to operate flights from Europe to Egypt. The airline has said "These flights are serving businessmen and tourists, thus making Lufthansa a key tool boosting the bilateral economic ties between Egypt and Germany". In addition, the airline now has code-share arrangements with EgyptAir boosting travel between the nations.

Cultural
In 1873, the Deutsche Evangelische Oberschule (German evangelic school) was established in Cairo.

The Egyptian–German cultural agreement, signed in 1959, is the major framework which organizes Egyptian–German cultural relations. Egypt and Germany also signed two agreements in 1979 and 1981 on scientific and cultural cooperation between the two countries.

Egyptian–German cultural cooperation is characterized in the following:

 Goethe institute, which successfully plays a leading role in promoting the German cultural activities in Egypt.
 The German Academic Exchange Service (DAAD), which offers many scholarships to Egyptian professors to study in Germany.
 Mubarak-Kohl project for technical and vocational education.
 The German University in Cairo, which was opened on October 5, 2003.

See also 

 Foreign relations of Egypt
 Foreign relations of Germany

Literature  
 Mahmoud Kassim: Die diplomatischen Beziehungen Deutschlands zu Ägypten, 1919–1936. LIT Verlag, Münster 2000.

References

External links 
 

 
Germany
Bilateral relations of Germany